Tapuya (or Tapuyá) is a Tupian term meaning ‘enemy’ or ‘foreigner’ that is used to refer to various unrelated non-Tupian ethnic groups. It can refer to:

Carapana language, also called Carapana-tapuya, a Tucanoan language
Karu language (Moriwene), also called Sucuriyú-tapuya, an Arawakan language
Pira-tapuya, an indigenous people of the Amazon regions
Wanano language, also called Pira-tapuya, a Tucanoan language

See also
Baniwa language (disambiguation)
Maku language